Thein Han (born 20 March 1998) is a basketball player from Myanmar. 
He represented Myanmar's national basketball team at the 2017 SEABA Championship in Quezon City, Philippines. 

There, at only 19 years of age, he was the tournament’s dominant stealer as he averaged 3.0 steals per game, far ahead of the second placed Jio Jalalon of the Philippines who recorded 2.0 per game. Further, Han Thein was the tournament's top shot blocker as he averaged 2.3 per game.

At the game against Vietnam, he came close to reaching a quadruple-double, an extremely rare achievement for a single player in a basketball game.

References

External links
 FIBA Profile
 Asia-basket.com FIBA Profile

1998 births
Living people
Centers (basketball)
Competitors at the 2017 Southeast Asian Games
Competitors at the 2019 Southeast Asian Games
Myanmar men's basketball players
Southeast Asian Games competitors for Myanmar